Be Together is a 2015 Chinese romance film directed by Yan Fei. The film was released on February 13, 2015.

Cast
Kristy Yang as Ke Min
Michael Tong
Chi Shuai
Zhou Lingnan

Reception
By February 16, the film had earned  at the Chinese box office.

References

Chinese romance films
2015 romance films
2010s Mandarin-language films